The 2012–13 Fortuna Düsseldorf season is the 118th season in the club's football history. In 2012–13 the club plays in the Bundesliga, the top tier of German football. It is the clubs first season back in this league, having been promoted from the 2. Bundesliga in 2012. Fortuna Düsseldorf beat Hertha BSC in the promotion/relegation Playoff to earn a spot in the 2012–13 Bundesliga season. The sports court and the Federal Court of the German Football Association (DFB) confirmed the club's promotion after Hertha BSC appealed the result of the second leg and lost on both accounts.

The club also takes part in the 2012–13 edition of the DFB-Pokal, the German Cup, where it reached the second round and will face fellow Bundesliga side Borussia Mönchengladbach next.

Review and events
Andreas Lambertz will start the season with a two match ban. The ban is for celebrating with a torch in his hand after the second leg of the promotion/relegation playoff when Fortuna defeated Hertha BSC on aggregate. The disciplinary panel of the German Football Association decided that Fortuna must play their first home match with no supporters for the supporters running onto the field during the second leg of the promotion/relegation playoff. The club was also hit with a €100,000 fine. After an appeal, the ban on supporters inside the stadium for the first home match was overturned and are now limited to 25,000 supporters for the first two home matches which includes 5,000 visiting supporters.  However, the €100,000 fine was increased to €150,000.

Pre-season training commenced on 28 June 2012.

Matches

Legend

Bundesliga

League results and fixtures

League table

League summary table

DFB-Pokal

Squad information

Squad and statistics

|}

Transfers

In

Out

Sources

External links
 2012–13 Fortuna Düsseldorf season at Weltfussball.de 
 2012–13 Fortuna Düsseldorf season at kicker.de 
 2012–13 Fortuna Düsseldorf season at Fussballdaten.de 

Fortuna Dusseldorf
Fortuna Düsseldorf seasons